Shorea obovoidea is a species of tree in the family Dipterocarpaceae. It is endemic to Borneo.

References

obovoidea
Endemic flora of Borneo
Trees of Borneo
Taxonomy articles created by Polbot